Twilight is a 1940 German drama film directed by Rudolf van der Noss and starring Viktor Staal, Ruth Hellberg and Carl Raddatz. The film's art direction was by Hermann Asmus and Carl Ludwig Kirmse.

Cast
 Viktor Staal as Walter Gruber
 Ruth Hellberg as Grete Kuhnert
 Carl Raddatz as Robert Thiele
 Ursula Grabley as Renate Gutzeit
 Fritz Genschow as Forstmeister Jürgens
 Paul Wegener as Förster Kuhnert
 Hans Stiebner as Schankwirt Gutzeit
 Wilhelm König as Alfred Gruber
 Willi Rose as Kriminalassistent Sievers
 Wilhelm Althaus as Kriminalrat Malzahn
 Gerhard Dammann as Dornkaat
 Erich Dunskus as Gendarmeriewachtmeister Weber
 Albert Lippert as Kriminalkommissar Hagenbach
 Ernst Rotmund as Zirkusdirektor Mansfeld
 Kate Kühl as Emilie
 Walter Lieck as Schulze
 Lotte Rausch as Amanda
 Willi Schur as Köppke
 Paul Westermeier as Paul Borchert
 Otto Matthies
 Bob Bolander
 Otto Braml
 Kurt Cramer
 Kurt Dreml
 Erich Haußmann
 Paul Hildebrandt
 Fritz Hube
 Hellmuth Passarge
 Arthur Reinhardt
 Rudolf Renfer
 Walter Schenk
 Herbert Schimkat
 Willy Stettner
 Hermann Stetza

References

Bibliography

External links 
 

1940 films
Films of Nazi Germany
1940s German-language films
UFA GmbH films
German black-and-white films
1940 drama films
German drama films
1940s German films